Plocama puberula is a species of flowering plant in the family Rubiaceae. It is endemic to the Socotra archipelago of Yemen. Its natural habitat is rocky areas.

References

External links
World Checklist of Rubiaceae

Endemic flora of Socotra
puberula
Least concern plants
Taxa named by Isaac Bayley Balfour